Gaston's War is a Belgian 1997 drama film directed by Robbe De Hert and starring Werner De Smedt, Mapi Galán and Peter Firth. Based on a novel by Allan Mayer, the film is set many decades after the Second World War, and tells the story of a Belgian resistance fighter, Gaston Vandermeerssche, who tries to discover who betrayed them to the Nazis.

Main cast
 Werner De Smedt as Gaston Vandermeerssche
 Mapi Galán as Veronique
 Stuart Laing as Harry
 Oliver Windross as Doug
 Peter Firth as Major Smith
 Christian Crahay as Hachez
 Olivia Williams as Nicky
 Lukas Smolders as Louis
 Clive Swift as General James
 Marilou Mermans as Farmer's wife
 René van Asten as Van der Waals
 Sylvia Kristel as Miep Visser
 Stefan Perceval as German soldier
 Gert-Jan Dröge as Cohen
 Serge Marechal as Frenchman

References

External links

Danish drama films
Dutch drama films
Belgian drama films
1997 drama films
1990s Dutch-language films
Films directed by Robbe De Hert
1997 films
1990s English-language films